Borommarachathirat II or Borom Rachathirat II, also known as King Samphraya (1386–1448), was a king of Ayutthaya. His reign saw its early expansions.

He was a son of Intharacha who had finally taken the Ayutthayan throne for the Suphannaphum Dynasty. He had two elder brothers: Prince Aiphraya and Prince Yiphraya; and was appointed by his father to govern Chainat ( Phitsanulok's old name).

In 1424, Intharacha died. His two brothers marched from their respective cities to Ayutthaya for the throne. They fought on elephants in single combat and both died, leaving the throne to Samphraya. In 1433 Samphraya led Siamese forces to subjugate Cambodia plundering Angkor Thom. This assault eventually caused the Khmers to abandon Angkor and to relocate their capital further south-east.

And he ordered the Nakhonin to rule in Cambodia. Later, the Nakhonin died, he appointed the Prince of Phrak, his another son to reign in Cambodia. But the prince was assassinated by Ponhea Yat. Therefore allowing Ponhea Yat to become king instead of the prince. After that, Ponhea Yat moved the capital to Chaktomuk. To escape the influence of Siam, and wanting to move the center closer to the sea to further promote maritime trade.

The conquest, however, brought in a large influx of Khmer culture and traditions into the Siamese court. For example, the high reverence of Thai kingship as a deity, known as Devaraja, came from Cambodia.

King Sam Phraya also sought northward expansion. He married a daughter of the vassal Prince of Sukhothai, Maha Tammaraja IV, and had a son, who will grow up to be Prince Ramesuan. When the last king of Sukhothai died in 1446, his grandson inherited the kingdom, further strengthening Ayutthaya control over Sukhothai.

In 1442, Chao Sam Phraya led his armies to conquer Lanna. He managed to sack the capital Chiang Mai but was unable to conquer the kingdom.

Chao Sam Phraya died in 1448 and was succeeded by his son Prince Ramesuan as Trilokanat.

Ancestry

References

|-

1448 deaths
Suphannaphum dynasty
Kings of Ayutthaya
Year of birth unknown
15th-century monarchs in Asia
Princes of Ayutthaya
15th-century Thai people